Gahrymanberdi Ovezliyevich Chonkayev (born October 19, 1983) is a professional Turkmen footballer who plays as a striker for FC Ashgabat.

Club career 
In 2013 with FC Balkan he won the 2013 AFC President's Cup in Malaysia.

In the summer of 2019, he signed a contract with FC Aşgabat.

Career statistics

International

Statistics accurate as of match played 26 March 2013

International goals

Honours
Balkan 
 AFC President's Cup (1): 2013

Ahal
 Turkmenistan Super Cup (1): 2014

References

External links

1983 births
Living people
FC Aşgabat players
Turkmenistan footballers
Turkmenistan international footballers
Turkmenistan expatriate sportspeople in Kazakhstan
Expatriate footballers in Kazakhstan
Association football forwards